The 2004 World Outdoor Bowls Championship men's singles was held at the Northfield Bowls Complex in Ayr, Scotland, from 23 July to 7 August 2004.

Steve Glasson of Australia won the gold medal.

Qualifying round

Section 1

Section 2

Section 3

Section 4

Championship round

Section 1

Section 2

Bronze medal match
Meyer beat Turagabeci 15–9

Gold medal match
Glasson beat Marshall 21–15

Results

References

Men